Grant Robert Balfour (born 30 December 1977) is an Australian former professional baseball relief pitcher. He played in Major League Baseball (MLB) for the Minnesota Twins, Milwaukee Brewers, Tampa Bay Devil Rays / Rays, and Oakland Athletics. He is second all-time in saves and strikeouts among Australian MLB pitchers behind Liam Hendriks, and holds the Oakland Athletics consecutive save record at 44.

Background
Notable as one of only a handful of Australian-born Major League Baseball players, Balfour spent his first years at school attending Kings Langley Public School and high school years at William Clarke College in Kellyville, New South Wales.

Baseball career

Minnesota Twins

Cincinnati Reds

Milwaukee Brewers
After a three-year absence, Balfour made his return to the major leagues on 18 July, in the 8th inning with the Milwaukee Brewers. He relieved Chris Capuano in a 2–2 tie with the Arizona Diamondbacks, striking out outfielder Chris Young, the first hitter he faced. With two outs in the 8th, he hit a batter and walked another before giving up a three-run home run to Mark Reynolds, giving the Diamondbacks a 5–2 lead. Balfour would finish the 8th and 9th inning and take the loss in relief, having given up three earned runs in the 5–2 defeat.

Tampa Bay Rays
The Brewers designated Balfour for assignment on 27 July 2007, and traded him to the Tampa Bay Rays that day for Seth McClung. He finished the season in the Rays' bullpen and was re-signed to a one-year deal.

He came into  spring training as a long shot to make the Rays' bullpen. Despite a solid spring training, he eventually lost for on the final spot and was designated for assignment. He cleared waivers and accepted an outright assignment to Triple-A Durham on 3 April 2008.

He was recalled from Durham on 29 May 2008. He earned a save on 31 May against the Chicago White Sox, retiring Brian Anderson to end the game in a Rays 2–0 win. In a series sweep against the Chicago Cubs at Tropicana Field, he was credited with two of the three wins – the first on 16 June, relieving Scott Kazmir with the score 1–1 and bases loaded, pitching  perfect innings in a 3–2 win; the second on 18 June, entering the game trailing 1–2, and pitching  innings, recording three strikeouts, in a game the Rays won 8–3.

He finished 2008 with a 1.54 ERA, a 6–2 record, 4 saves out of 5 opportunities, 14 holds, and 82 strikeouts over  IP in 51 appearances. He helped the Rays win their first divisional title and American League pennant (against the Boston Red Sox), losing to the Phillies in the World Series,

In 2009, he chose to skip the 2009 World Baseball Classic because the Rays asked him not to play for Australia while he was still under contract. That season was much less successful for the Rays, who finished 84–78, 19 games behind the New York Yankees. Although he pitched considerably more innings and games pitched, he finished a disappointing 5–4, with 4 saves and a 4.81 ERA for the season with 69 strikeouts compared to the previous season's 82.

Balfour is known to shout at himself while on the mound and use profanity to fire himself up. On 2 October 2008, during Game 1 of the ALDS, he was involved in an exchange of words with Chicago White Sox shortstop Orlando Cabrera. With the bases loaded and two outs, his first pitch to Cabrera was outside for ball one. Cabrera then kicked the dirt in front of the batter's box in the direction of the pitcher's mound and according to Balfour, Cabrera told him to "throw it over the plate." Unaware of Balfour's behavior while pitching, Cabrera was under the impression that he was the one being yelled at. The at-bat continued and ended with Cabrera striking out. Balfour stormed off the mound, yelling at Cabrera as he walked to the dugout. Balfour stated after the game that he told Cabrera to "go sit down" and that he "might have mixed one or two words in with it." Deemed a misunderstanding between the two, there were no further incidents in the series, with Balfour getting the final out as the Rays won three games to one.

In December 2009, he signed a new contract with Tampa Bay, worth $2.05 million over one year.

Oakland Athletics
On 18 January 2011, Balfour signed a 2-year, $8 million contract with the Oakland Athletics. On 20 March 2012, he was named the Athletics' closer over Brian Fuentes. Balfour held the closer role for the early part of the 2012 season but was demoted after a few blown saves to the role of setup man. In early August, Balfour regained the closer role from Ryan Cook. Balfour went 3–2 in 75 appearances with 24 saves in  innings pitched in 2012. On 29 October, the Athletics decided to exercise their option for Balfour worth $4.5M.

On 8 July 2013, Balfour set the record for most consecutive saves for the Athletics, earning his 41st in a 2–1 win over the Pittsburgh Pirates. He was selected later in the month as a replacement All-Star pitcher for teammate Bartolo Colón.

In 65 appearances, Balfour finished the year 38–41 in save opportunities, going 1–3 with a 2.59 ERA as the team's closer, striking out 72 in 62.2 innings with a .206 OBA. He pitched three scoreless innings in the ALDS against the Tigers, getting one win and one save.

In Game 3 of the 2013 ALDS against the Detroit Tigers, Balfour began cursing at Victor Martinez, who then answered back, leading to both benches clearing. Balfour claimed that Martinez gave him a "viral death stare" prior to exchanging words as he composed it on Twitter. The A's would go on to win the game 6-3 but lost the series in 5 games.

Second stint with the Tampa Bay Rays
On 17 December 2013, it was reported that Balfour had come to an agreement with the Baltimore Orioles on a two-year, $15 million deal. However, on 19 December 2013, it was revealed that the deal was in serious jeopardy as a result of issues that came up during his physical. On 20 December, the Orioles announced that they would not be signing him and that they would look elsewhere for relief help. Balfour responded that he was perfectly healthy and other doctors who examined him disputed the Orioles interpretation of his physical results. He said he would consider filing a grievance with the players association.

Balfour subsequently agreed to a two-year contract with the Rays, worth $12 million. After starting the 2014 season with a 6.46 ERA in 24 games, Balfour was removed from the closer role on 9 June 2014.

He was designated for assignment by the Rays on 18 April 2015, and released on 29 April. Several days after the team released him, Balfour signed a minor league deal back with the Rays. While pitching with Triple-A Durham, Balfour held a 2.79 ERA in eight games, owning an 11:4 K:BB ratio over  innings. He opted out of his contract on 28 May.

On 29 April 2016, Balfour announced his retirement.

Personal life
Balfour's father, David, was a rugby player and general manager and owner of the Sydney Blue Sox. David was diagnosed with pancreatic cancer in 2010 and died on 10 March 2015.

Balfour was inducted into the Baseball Australia Hall of Fame in February 2015.

References

External links

1977 births
Living people
Major League Baseball players from Australia
Australian expatriate baseball players in Canada
Australian expatriate baseball players in the United States
Olympic baseball players of Australia
Baseball players at the 2000 Summer Olympics
Major League Baseball pitchers
Sportsmen from New South Wales
Minnesota Twins players
Milwaukee Brewers players
Tampa Bay Devil Rays players
Tampa Bay Rays players
Oakland Athletics players
Sarasota Reds players
Fort Myers Miracle players
Edmonton Trappers players
Rochester Red Wings players
Dayton Dragons players
Huntsville Stars players
Nashville Sounds players
Durham Bulls players
Gulf Coast Twins players
Elizabethton Twins players
Quad Cities River Bandits players
Gulf Coast Reds players
New Britain Rock Cats players
Charlotte Stone Crabs players
American League All-Stars
Baseball players from Sydney